The FIL World Luge Championships 1967 took place in Hammarstrand, Sweden between 18-19 February 1967. This event was held following the cancellation of the previous year's championships in Friedrichroda, East Germany, which was the last cancellation in the history of the world championships.

Men's singles

Women's singles

Men's doubles

Medal table

References
FIL-Luge.org list of World luge champions.  - Accessed January 31, 2008.
"Luge and Olympism". Olympic Review. December 1983. p. 862.
Men's doubles World Champions
Men's singles World Champions
Women's singles World Champions

FIL World Luge Championships
1967 in luge
1967 in Swedish sport
Luge in Sweden
February 1967 sports events in Europe